"El Nene" (Spanish for "The Boy") is a song by Dominican-American producer Foreign Teck and Puerto Rican rapper Anuel AA. The song was released on October 27, 2022, through WK RECORDS and Real Hasta la Muerte as the sixth single from Anuel AA's fifth studio album LLNM2.

Background 

Foreign Teck hinted at his next single in an Instagram post. Later Anuel AA posted a preview of the song called "El Nene". The official visualizer of the song was posted on October 27, 2022, on Anuel's YouTube channel. The music video was released one day later. On November 26, 2022, Anuel AA announced that "El Nene" would be one of the singles of his upcoming studio album LLNM2.

Commercial performance 

"El Nene" debuted and peaked at number 12 on the US Billboard Latin Digital Song Sales chart on November 12, 2022. In Spain's official weekly chart, the song debuted at number 59.

Music video 

The music video for "El Nene" was released on October 28, 2022, and shows the gangster life. Anuel AA is shown with a wad of bills, something this song also talks about because it reflects that fame sometimes makes him distrust anyone.

Live performances 
Anuel AA performed "El Nene" at The Tonight Show Starring Jimmy Fallon on January 18, 2022.

Charts

Certifications

References 

2022 singles
Anuel AA songs